James Maynard may refer to: 

 James Maynard (entrepreneur) (born 1940), American entrepreneur
 James Maynard (mathematician) (born 1987), British mathematician
 James Mortimer Maynard, businessman and politician of the Cape Colony
 Buster Maynard (James Walter Maynard), American baseball player